WFXJ-FM (107.5 MHz) — branded 107.5 The Fox — is a commercial classic rock radio station licensed to North Kingsville, Ohio.  Owned by Media One Radio Group, the station serves the Northeast Ohio county of Ashtabula, and is the local affiliate for The Bob & Tom Show and Nights with Alice Cooper.  The WFXJ-FM studios are located in the city of Ashtabula, while the station transmitter resides in Kingsville. It is one of five stations in Media One Radio Group's Ashtabula cluster, the others being WFUN (AM), WQGR (FM), WREO-FM, WYBL (FM), and WZOO-FM.

History
The construction permit for the station was obtained by Emily W. Chismar in the name of EWC Enterprises, Ltd. on April 22, 1999, and the calls WPHR were granted on October 15, 1999. The construction permit was transferred to Clear Channel Communications on July 11, 2000. Clear Channel obtained the calls WCUZ on January 18, 2001, when it moved the WPHR calls to its station in Tulsa, Oklahoma. It finally settled on WFXJ-FM on August 6, 2001.

WFXJ-FM was sold off by Clear Channel to Media One Radio Group in September 2007.

Current programming
WFXJ-FM airs The Bob & Tom Show during weekday mornings via Premiere Networks, and Nights with Alice Cooper weekday nights via United Stations Radio Networks.

References

External links

Ashtabula, Ohio
FXJ-FM
Radio stations established in 1999
Classic rock radio stations in the United States
1999 establishments in Ohio